David L. Knudson (born April 30, 1950) is an American lawyer, former Majority Leader of the South Dakota Senate, and a member of the Republican Party.

Early life and education 
Knudson was born and raised in Yankton, South Dakota, and graduated from Yankton High School.

Knudson majored in government and philosophy at Harvard University, and graduated with honors in 1972. Following college, he attended New York University School of Law on a full scholarship through the Root-Tilden Scholar program, and graduated in 1975. Knudson received his Master of Business Administration from the University of South Dakota in 1981.

Knudson resides in Sioux Falls with his wife De, a former member of the Sioux Falls City Council. They married in 1976, and have two sons.

2010 gubernatorial election 

On December 21, 2008, Knudson filed paper work with South Dakota Secretary of State to start a campaign committee to seek the Republican nomination for governor in 2010. Knudson was the fourth candidate to enter the race.

References

External links 
Dave Knudson for Governor official campaign site
State Senator Dave Knudson official site
David L. Knudson at Davenport, Evans, Hurwitz & Smith

1950 births
21st-century American politicians
Chiefs of staff to United States state governors
Harvard University alumni
Living people
New York University School of Law alumni
Politicians from Sioux Falls, South Dakota
People from Yankton, South Dakota
South Dakota lawyers
Republican Party South Dakota state senators
University of South Dakota alumni